Djurgården will in the 2008 season compete in the Allsvenskan, Svenska Cupen and UEFA Cup

Djurgården started the season with 9 matches without a defeat. With many injuries on key players, such as old Swedish international Mattias Jonson, Finnish legend Aki Riihilahti and new Finnish star Daniel Sjölund,  and bad playing Djurgården ended 12th, their worst season since 1999. The new 20-year-old from Enköpings SK, Sebastian Rajalakso scored most goals.

Squad 

As of July 2, 2008.

Out on loan

Transfers

Players in

Players out

Club

Coaching staff

Kit

|
|

Other information

Player statistics
Appearances for competitive matches only

|}

Goals

Total

Allsvenskan

Svenska Cupen

UEFA Cup

Competitions

Allsvenskan

Matches
Results for Djurgårdens IF for season 2008.

NOTE: scores are written DIF first

Svenska Cupen

UEFA Cup

|}

Friendlies

Djurgården League Top Goalscorers/Assist in the Allsvenskan 2008 Season
Updated 10 November 2008

Djurgården League Top Goalscorers/Assist in the UEFA Cup 2008–09

References 

Djurgårdens IF Fotboll seasons
Djurgarden